Northern Pacific Depot, Northern Pacific Railway Depot, Northern Pacific Passenger Depot, Northern Pacific Railroad Depot, or Northern Pacific Railway Passenger Depot may refer to the following stations in the United States:

Idaho 
 Northern Pacific Depot (Sandpoint, Idaho), listed on the National Register of Historic Places in Bonner County
 Northern Pacific Railway Depot (Wallace, Idaho), listed on the National Register of Historic Places in Shoshone County

Minnesota 
 Northern Pacific Depot (Aitkin, Minnesota), listed on the National Register of Historic Places in Aitkin County
 Northern Pacific Passenger Depot (Detroit Lakes, Minnesota), listed on the National Register of Historic Places listings in Becker County, Minnesota
 Northern Pacific Depot (Fergus Falls, Minnesota), listed on the National Register of Historic Places in Otter Tail County
 Northern Pacific Depot (Finlayson, Minnesota), listed on the National Register of Historic Places in Pine County
 Northern Pacific Depot (Hinckley, Minnesota), listed on the National Register of Historic Places in Pine County
 Northern Pacific Railway Depot (Little Falls, Minnesota), listed on the National Register of Historic Places in Morrison County
 Northern Pacific Depot (Starbuck, Minnesota), listed on the National Register of Historic Places in Pope County
 Northern Pacific Depot (Villard, Minnesota), listed on the National Register of Historic Places in Pope County
 Northern Pacific Passenger Depot (Wadena, Minnesota), listed on the National Register of Historic Places in Wadena County

Montana 
 Northern Pacific Depot (Billings, Montana), listed on the National Register of Historic Places in Yellowstone County
 Northern Pacific Passenger Depot (Livingston, Montana), listed as a contributing property on the National Register of Historic Places in Park County
 Northern Pacific Railway Depot (Miles City, Montana), listed on the National Register of Historic Places in Custer County
 Northern Pacific Railroad Depot (Missoula, Montana), listed on the National Register of Historic Places in Missoula County

North Dakota 
 Northern Pacific Railroad Depot (Amenia, North Dakota)
 Northern Pacific Railway Depot (Bismarck, North Dakota), listed on the National Register of Historic Places in Burleigh County
 Northern Pacific Railway Depot (Fargo, North Dakota), listed on the National Register of Historic Places in Cass County
 Northern Pacific Depot and Freight House, Grand Forks, NRHP-listed, in Grand Forks County

Washington 
 Northern Pacific Railway Depot (Cheney, Washington), listed on the National Register of Historic Places in Spokane County
 Northern Pacific Railway Passenger Depot (Ellensburg, Washington), listed on the National Register of Historic Places in Kittitas County
 Northern Pacific Depot (Lester, Washington), listed on the National Register of Historic Places in King County
 Northern Pacific Railway Depot (Ritzville, Washington), listed as a contributing property on the National Register of Historic Places in Adams County
 Northern Pacific Railway Depot (Tenino, Washington), listed on the National Register of Historic Places in Thurston County
 Northern Pacific Railway Passenger Depot (Walla Walla, Washington), listed on the National Register of Historic Places in Walla Walla County

See also 
 :Category:Former Northern Pacific Railway stations